Bumetopia flavovariegata is a species of beetle in the family Cerambycidae. It was described by Per Olof Christopher Aurivillius in 1911.

Subspecies
 Bumetopia flavovariegata flavovariegata (Aurivillius, 1911)
 Bumetopia flavovariegata javanica Breuning, 1958

References

Homonoeini
Beetles described in 1911